Dehnow-e Mohammad Qoli (also Romanized as Dehnow-e Moḩammad Qolī; also known as Dehnow-e Ḩājmoḩammadqolī) is a village in Rig Rural District, in the Central District of Lordegan County, Chaharmahal and Bakhtiari Province, Iran. At the 2006 census, its population was 383, in 81 families.

References 

Populated places in Lordegan County